Silvia Farina Elia (born 27 April 1972) is a former professional tennis player from Italy. She won three WTA singles titles, reached the quarterfinals of the 2003 Wimbledon Championships and achieved a career-high singles ranking of world No. 11 in May 2002. Farina Elia won her first ITF title at Caltagirone in 1991 and her first WTA tournament at Strasbourg in 2001. She made her debut Grand Slam appearance at the 1991 French Open and was coached by husband Francesco Elia, whom she married September 1999.

Career
Farina Elia made steady progression on the ITF circuit during the early 1990s and finished her first year in the top 100 in 1991. She completed her first victory over a top ten player (Gabriela Sabatini, Roland Garros) in 1994 and won her first doubles title the next year. In 1996, she represented Italy at the Atlanta Olympics. 1998 was considered her breakthrough year, reaching the final of four tournaments and in the process securing a place in the year end top 20. She was 26 at the time and thus considered a "late bloomer". She only reached one singles final in 1999 but made a greater impact in doubles, winning three tournaments.

In 2001, Farina Elia won a belated first WTA Tour title, at the Internationaux de Strasbourg. She ended the year No. 14, what was to be her best year end finish and played in the WTA Tour Championships of 2001 and 2002. She consolidated the Strasbourg win with two more wins at the tournament. In 2003, she achieved her best Grand Slam result at the unlikely venue of Wimbledon, home of her least favourite surface, losing to Kim Clijsters, 7–5, 0–6, 1–6 in the quarterfinals.

Farina Elia represented Italy at nine Federation Cups and also at three Olympics.

On Monday 24 October 2005, she announced her retirement from the tour due a recurrence of a shoulder, saying, "My body has given all it can."

Personal life
Farina Elia began playing tennis aged 10; introduced to the sport by her mother, who played recreationally. Her parents are both insurance agents, as is her sister, Olga. Her brother, Enrico, restores furniture. She married Francesco Elia on 22 September 1999 and described the prospect of life after tennis as "exciting".

WTA career finals

Singles: 13 (3 titles, 10 runner-ups)

Doubles: 17 (9 titles, 8 runner-ups)
Wins
2004: Warsaw (w/ Francesca Schiavone)
2001: Strasbourg (w/ Iroda Tulyaganova)
2000: Palermo (w/ Rita Grande)
1999: Auckland (w/ Barbara Schett)
1999: 's Hertogenbosch (w/ Rita Grande)
1999: Pörtschach (w/ Karina Habšudová)
1998: Prague (w/ Karina Habšudová)
1997: Palermo (w/ Barbara Schett)
1995: Maria Lankowitz (with Andrea Temesvári)

Runner-ups
2005: Gold Coast (w/ Maria Elena Camerin)
2004: Paris (w/ Francesca Schiavone)
2003: Linz (w/ Marion Bartoli)
2000: Hannover (w/ Karina Habšudová)
1997: Gold Coast (w/ Ruxandra Dragomir)
1996: Moscow (w/ Barbara Schett)
1993: Palermo (w/ Brenda Schultz)
1990: Taranto (w/ Rita Grande)

ITF finals

Singles (2–1)

Doubles (6–2)

Head-to-head record against other players in the top 10
Players who have been ranked world No. 1 are in boldface.

Dominique Monami 1-4
Martina Hingis 1-4
Lindsay Davenport 1-7
Dinara Safina 0-2
Arantxa Sánchez Vicario 0-5
Serena Williams 1-1
Maria Sharapova 1-1
Justine Henin 0-3
Kim Clijsters 0-6
Amélie Mauresmo 0-7
Jelena Janković 2-1
 Elena Dementieva 1-3
 Iva Majoli 0-4
 Jana Novotná 1-5
 Anna Kournikova 3-4
 Flavia Pennetta 1-0
 Nadia Petrova 0-4
 Karina Habšudová 2-1

References

External links
 
 
 

1972 births
Hopman Cup competitors
Living people
Italian female tennis players
Olympic tennis players of Italy
Tennis players from Milan
Tennis players at the 1996 Summer Olympics
Tennis players at the 2000 Summer Olympics
Tennis players at the 2004 Summer Olympics